The purple mbuna (Melanochromis vermivorus) is a species of cichlid endemic to Lake Malawi.  This species can reach a length of  SL.  It can also be found in the aquarium trade.

References

Purple mbuna
Fish of Lake Malawi
Fish of Malawi
Fish described in 1935
Taxa named by Ethelwynn Trewavas 
Taxonomy articles created by Polbot